Akuma was a punk band from Montreal, founded in 1998 by former Banlieue Rouge member Safwan Hamdi.
According to a post on the Facebook page of Rock My World Canada, "the band distinguishes itself through its opposition to neoliberalism, both through its lyrics and through its actions."

History
The original line-up was Safwan Hamdi (guitar and vocals), 'Simon' (bass and background vocals), 'Sylva' (drums), and 'Mark' (guitar, background vocals).  It was this line-up which created the group's first album, 100 Démons, released in 2001. Mark and Simon left the band and were replaced by 'Sébastien' (bass) and 'Yannick' (guitar).

In 2004, the band released the album Subversion through Pavillon Noir. 

In 2006, the band released ...Des Cendres Et Du Désespoir (Ashes and Despair).

One of Akuma's songs appeared on a compilation released by the 1999 Festival Polliwog, which was an annual Montreal punk-metal festival. The band played the Festival d'été de Québec and the 2001 Vans Warped Tour. There was a 2002 tour of France with Tagada Jones and Oberkampf; Akuma's last show was in 2008. While their website is still active, there have been no posts since that year.

Discography
 100 Démons (1998), Union Label Group
 Subversion (2004), Pavillon Noir 
 ...Des Cendres Et Du Désespoir (2006), Pavillon Noir

References

External links
 Akuma - Official Web site

Canadian hardcore punk groups
Musical groups established in 1998
Musical groups from Montreal
1998 establishments in Quebec